Vera Grushkina (born 17 August 1947) is a Soviet athlete. She competed in the women's high jump at the 1968 Summer Olympics.

References

1947 births
Living people
Athletes (track and field) at the 1968 Summer Olympics
Soviet female high jumpers
Olympic athletes of the Soviet Union
Place of birth missing (living people)